Quasimode may mean:

 a mode in user interfaces that is kept in place only through some constant action on the part of the user
 Quasimode (band), a Japanese jazz band